Annex is an unincorporated community and census-designated place in Malheur County, Oregon, United States. Its population was 235 as of the 2010 census. The community is located on the south bank of the Snake River across from Weiser, Idaho; a bridge carrying U.S. Route 95 Spur connects the two.

Geography

Demographics

Education
Annex is within the Annex School District 29. It operates a K-8 school called the Annex Charter School. In 1967 the Annex School was having a new building established.

 students who graduate from Annex attend Weiser High School, of the Weiser School District, in Weiser, Idaho. In 1958, there were 46 students at Weiser High who lived in Annex.

The section of Malheur County in which this community is located in is in the Treasure Valley Community College district.

References

Unincorporated communities in Malheur County, Oregon
Unincorporated communities in Oregon
Census-designated places in Malheur County, Oregon
Census-designated places in Oregon